The '1999' Party is a live album by Hawkwind recorded at the Chicago Auditorium Theatre on 21 March 1974 released retrospectively in November 1997 by EMI. It was issued for the first time as part of EMI's re-releasing re-mastered versions of the Hawkwind back catalogue. A further budget single disk derived from this set titled Hawkwind Live 74 was issued in April 2006.

Band changes
Hawkwind first toured North America in November and December 1973 undertaking 10 dates performing the Space Ritual set, albeit without Robert Calvert and Dik Mik who had left in July. On that tour Del Dettmar had bought land in Canada with the intention of emigrating, but remained with the band playing from the mixing desk rather than the stage until eventually leaving in June 1974. Simon House, who had known the band from his time with High Tide, was brought in playing alongside Dettmar and accompanied the band on this tour but, not being able to get the correct work permit in time, his participation was strictly unofficial.

The tour
Despite bad reviews, low album sales, lack of promotion and interest from their US record company, Hawkwind self-financed this North America tour safe in the knowledge that they could fill halls. Under the banner The 1999 Party, it ran from March through April 1974 and included the full stage show featuring DJ Andy Dunkley, dancer Stacia and light show by Liquid Len, with a one-hour slot for the support band Man.

1 March: Los Angeles
2 March: Santa Monica, Auditorium
3 March: San Diego, JJ Club
7 March: San Francisco, Auditorium
10 March: Berkeley, University
15 March: Kansas City, Soldiers & Sailors
16 March: St. Louis, Auditorium
19 March: Milwaukee, Riverside Theatre
21 March: Chicago, Auditorium Theatre
22 March: Cleveland, Allen Theatre
23 March: Detroit, Palace
24 March: South Bend, Morris Auditorium
29 March: Atlanta, Electric Ballroom
2 April: Nashville
5 April: Philadelphia, Tower Theatre
6 April: New York, Steins Academy
7 April: Baltimore, Latin Casino
8 April: Boston, Orpheum Auditorium
10 April: Buffalo
13 April: Washington, Warner Theatre
14 April: Montreal
15 April: Toronto, Massey Hall

The Berkeley date was in benefit of Timothy Leary who had been imprisoned after being extradited from Afghanistan for his use and promotion of drugs. A phone call from his cell was broadcast over the PA interrupting the Man set. At the Nashville date "their equipment sustained damage estimated at nearly £1000 when the roof was ripped from the Nashville Hotel" by a tornado; Both the Chicago and Detroit shows were recorded.

When the band next returned to the USA in September, five dates in after the Hammond, Indiana show the Internal Revenue Service impounded the band's equipment in lieu of an outstanding $8000 tax bill from this tour, prohibiting the band from continuing. Once the legal situation was sorted, the tour was re-scheduled for a month later.

The set
The set was revamped from the Space Ritual set, with only three poems and three songs remaining. Two Michael Moorcock poems based on his Eternal Champion theme, which would later be used for Warrior on the Edge of Time, are worked into the set and there are five new tracks which would later be recorded for Hall of the Mountain Grill album.

The Man set also received a retrospective release in June 2001 as The 1999 Party Tour (Voiceprint).

Track listing

Disc 1
"Intro" (Andy Dunkley) / "Standing On The Edge" (Michael Moorcock) – 4:16
"Brainbox Pollution" (Dave Brock) – 7:52
"It's So Easy" (Brock) – 11:02
"You Know You're Only Dreaming" (Brock) – 4:43
"Veterans of a Thousand Psychic Wars" (Moorcock) – 2:21
"Brainstorm" (Nik Turner) – 9:19
"Seven By Seven" (Brock) – 9:26

Disc 2
"The Watcher" (Ian Kilmister) – 6:40
"The Awakening" (Robert Calvert) – 2:40
"Paradox" (Brock) – 5:43
"You'd Better Believe It" (Brock) – 8:09
"Psychedelic Warlords" (Brock) – 3:47
"D-Rider" (Turner) – 7:46
"Sonic Attack" (Moorcock) – 4:30
"Master Of The Universe" (Turner/Brock) – 6:57
"Welcome To The Future" (Calvert) – 2:32

Hawkwind Live 74
"Brainbox Pollution"
"You Know You're Only Dreaming"
"Brainstorm"
"Seven By Seven"
"You'd Better Believe It"
"The Psychedelic Warlords (Disappear In Smoke)"
"D-Rider"
"Master Of The Universe"
"Welcome To The Future"

Personnel 
Dave Brock – Electric guitar, Vocals
Nik Turner – Saxophone, Flute, Vocals
Lemmy (Ian Kilmister) – Bass guitar, Vocals
Del Dettmar – Synthesizer
Simon House – Violin, Keyboards
Simon King – Drums

References 

Hawkwind live albums
1997 live albums